Al-Sha'war is a sub-district located in Hazm al-'Udayn District, Ibb Governorate, Yemen. Al-Sha'war had a population of 6149 according to the 2004 census.

References 

Sub-districts in Hazm al-'Udayn District